Walking shoe may refer to:

Footwear
 Sneakers, a type of shoe primarily designed for sports but widely used for everyday wear.
 Hiking boot, designed for protecting the feet and ankles during outdoor walking activities.

See also
 Walking shoes (disambiguation)